John Haslem may refer to:
 John Haslem (politician)
 John Haslem (artist)